The Highland Railway E Class was a class of 4-4-0 steam locomotive designed by David Jones for passenger service. They were also known as the 'Clyde Bogies' as they were built by the Clyde Locomotive Company in Glasgow, Scotland. They were the first locomotives built by that company.

Built in 1886, they were a development of Jones' previous F Class. Originally known as the Bruce class, they were assigned to Class E under Drummond's locomotive classification scheme of 1901.

Dimensions

Numbering

Transfer to LMS
All were still in service at the end of 1922, but when the Highland Railway engines passed to the London, Midland and Scottish Railway (LMS) on 1 September 1923, five had been withdrawn. Numbers 76A and 81A were withdrawn in 1924, but only 82A survived long enough to carry its LMS number (14278) – it was withdrawn in April 1930. No 79A was withdrawn in 1923 and stored at Aviemore until called for breaking up; this occurred at Kilmarnock in 1925.

References

Notes

E Class
4-4-0 locomotives
Railway locomotives introduced in 1886
Scrapped locomotives
Passenger locomotives